Goalpara East Assembly constituency is one of the 126 assembly constituencies of Assam Legislative Assembly in the north east state of Assam, India. Goalpara East is also part of Dhubri Lok Sabha constituency.

Members of Legislative Assembly 
 1967: B. K. Ghose, Independent
 1972: Balabhadra Das, Indian National Congress
 1978: Birendra Nath Choudhury, Communist Party of India (Marxist)
 1983: Mohammad Ali, Independent
 1985: Maziruddin Ahmed, Independent
 1991: Ratneshwar Das, Indian National Congress
 1996: Jyotish Das, Asom Gana Parishad
 2001: Shadeed Mazumder, Nationalist Congress Party
 2006: Dulal Chandra Ghosh, Nationalist Congress Party
 2011: Monowar Hussain, All India United Democratic Front
 2016: Abul Kalam Rasheed Alam, Indian National Congress
 2021: Abdul Kalam Rasheed Alam, Indian National Congress

Election results

2016 results

2011 results

2006 results

References

External links 
 

Assembly constituencies of Assam
Goalpara district